SQUORE is a software analytics and static code analysis tool for software projects. It gathers information from different artefacts types (e.g. source code, test results, bug tracking system) and tools (reads outputs of Checkstyle, PMD, FindBugs, Polyspace, Coverity or SonarQube) and publishes a summarised view of the project quality or progress. 

The quality model used for analysis is fully customisable, and many different quality models have been implemented: SQALE, ISO9126 maintainability, European Cooperation for Space Standardization or HIS Automotive group. It is used in the industry and academic research for software engineering and data mining related concerns.

History 

Squore was initially developed by  Squoring Technologies, a french software editor founded in 2010 in Toulouse and specialized in the evaluation and monitoring of software and systems development projects..

In June 2018, Vector Informatik acquired Squoring Technologies and is now the owner of the Squore tool.

Common uses 
The main goal of Squore's software analysis is the assessment of quality characteristics like maintainability, reliability or maturity. Software quality is subject to many definitions and debates; hence evaluation, sub-characteristics and metrics used will differ depending on the context of the analysis: e.g. critical flight systems, medical devices, desktop products.

Contract management may rely on code analysis to define levels of quality between contractors: e.g. cloning ratio, complexity of functions, specific ratings. By using such constraints stakeholders may accept or refuse a delivery based on the analysis result of the product.

See also 

 SQALE
 Static code analysis
 List of tools for static code analysis

References 

 Journal article: "Un outil pour évaluer la qualité des logiciels" (French), in Mesures (2010/09).
 Journal article: "Une plateforme collaborative d'évaluation de la qualité logicielle" (French), in Programmez! (2011/02).
 Schneider Electric press release: Schneider Electric uses SQuORING technologies software quality control (2012/03).
 Vector press release: Vector Acquires French Squoring Technologies (2018/09).

External links 
 

Software metrics
Software quality